Gompholobium hendersonii is a species of flowering plant in the family Fabaceae and is endemic to the south-west of Western Australia. It is an erect shrub with simple leaves, and red and purplish-brown, pea-like flowers.

Description
Flowering occurs from September to October and the fruit is a pod.

Taxonomy
Gompholobium hendersonii was first formally described in 1842 by Joseph Paxton in Paxton's Magazine of Botany from specimens grown in the gardens of "Messrs. Henderson, of Pine-apple Place" from seed collected in 1840 from the Swan River, by "Captain Mangles". The specific epithet (hendersonii) honours the gardener, Joseph Henderson.

Distribution and habitat
This pea grows on undulating plains in the Avon Wheatbelt Coolgardie and Mallee biogeographic regions in the south-west of Western Australia.

Conservation status
Gompholobium hendersonii is classified as "not threatened" by the Government of Western Australia Department of Parks and Wildlife.

References

hendersonii
Eudicots of Western Australia
Plants described in 1842
Taxa named by Joseph Paxton